Peblig is an electoral ward in the town of Caernarfon, Gwynedd, Wales, electing councillors to the town council and Gwynedd Council.

Description
The Peblig ward covers an area east of Caernarfon town centre, sandwiched by two A roads - to the north by the A4086 (Llanberis Road) and to the south by the A4085. The meandering Afon Seiont and the boundary of the Cibyn Industrial Estate form the eastern border. The ward includes the town's Church of St Peblig. The new environmentally friendly primary school, Ysgol y Hendre, is at the centre of the ward.

The ward population, according to the 2011 Census, was 2,321.

Town ward
Peblig is a ward to Caernarfon Town Council electing five of the seventeen town councillors.

In February 2019 Peblig town councillor, Kenny Richards known as Kenny Khan, claimed he was facing "discrimination" by being denied a seat on the Ysgol y Hendre Board of Governors. Despite a previous spell in gaol he was described as a "community champion" who ran affordable food outlets locally and in 2017 had been voted unanimously by the town council to be their representative on the Board.

County ward
Peblig became an electoral ward to (the pre-1996) Gwynedd County Council in 1989, electing an Independent councillor in 1989 and 1993.

Peblig has been an electoral ward to Gwynedd Council since 1995, electing one county councillor. Cllr W. Tudor Owen represented the ward from 1995, firstly as an Independent but winning the 1999 elections for Plaid Cymru. He had previously represented the ward on Arfon Borough Council. He was elected as vice chair of the county council in May 2011.

In the May 2012 county council election Cllr Owen retained the seat, beating the Llais Gwynedd candidate by 45 votes.

At the May 2017 county election Owen lost by only 3 votes to Independent candidate, Jason Parry.

* = sitting councillor prior to the election

See also
 List of electoral wards in Gwynedd
 Seiont (electoral ward)

References

Caernarfon
Gwynedd electoral wards
1989 establishments in Wales